Chankheli Peak is a 4210 m high mountain located in Mugu district, Karnali Province of Nepal. The mountain is believed to be featured in the one rupee bank note  because of its similar shape with Mount Ama Dablam. Mount Ama Dablam is the one actually featured in the note.

References

Mountains of Nepal
Mountains of the Karnali Province